Micropholcomma is a genus of spiders in the family Anapidae. It was first described in 1927 by Crosby & Bishop. , it contains 8 Australian species.

Species

Micropholcomma comprises the following species:
Micropholcomma bryophilum (Butler, 1932)
Micropholcomma caeligenum Crosby & Bishop, 1927
Micropholcomma junee Rix & Harvey, 2010
Micropholcomma linnaei Rix, 2008
Micropholcomma longissimum (Butler, 1932)
Micropholcomma mirum Hickman, 1944
Micropholcomma parmatum Hickman, 1944
Micropholcomma turbans Hickman, 1981

References

Anapidae
Araneomorphae genera
Spiders of Australia